Ramsbottom United Football Club are an English football club based in Ramsbottom, Greater Manchester. They are full members of the Lancashire County Football Association.

History
The club was founded in 1966 by present chairman Harry Williams. They first played in the Bury Amateur League.

In 1969 Ramsbottom moved leagues to the Bolton Combination. In the 1972–1973 season they won the Division One Championship and in the 1976–1977 season they won the Premier Division. The Rams spent a total of twenty years in this league before moving in 1989 to the Manchester League, playing in Division One. The 1989–90 they finished in third place, and the following season were Division One champions, earning promotion to the Premier Division, where they spent the next four seasons. At the end of the 1994–95 season, the club applied to the North West Counties Football League and following substantial ground improvements, were admitted into the league's Second Division in June 1995.

In their first season, The Rams finished twelfth and also won the Second Division Trophy with a 2–1 victory over Cheadle Town at Darwen's Anchor Ground. The following season they were crowned Second Division champions, pipping local rivals Haslingden on goal difference on the last day of the season. On 9 November 1996 they beat Stantondale 9–0, setting a club record winning margin and they also won all of their first 17 home fixtures. The club also entered the FA Vase for the first time, losing in the first qualifying round 0–1 at home to Tetley Walker.

The 1997–98 season, The Rams first season in First Division, the club finished Seventeenth. The following season saw the club finish in Eleventh place and also enter the FA Cup for the first time. They beat Maine Road 2–1 in a replay in the preliminary round, then won 3–0 at home to Shildon in the first qualifying round. In the second qualifying round they beat Billingham Town 3–0 before losing 0–5 at home to Conference National club Southport in the third qualifying round.

The 1999–2000 season saw a third-place finish, on 79 points. Russell Brierley became the club's top scorer in any one season with 38 league goals. In the following season they finished third again, this time on 88 points. In the 2001–2002 season the club finished fifteenth. Further mid-table finishes continued in the early 2000s, with a fifth-place in 2004–05, which also included a league double over eventual champions Fleetwood Town.

The Rams won the Bolton Hospitals Cup in the 2005–06 season with a 2–1 victory over Eagley at the Reebok Stadium, Bolton. In the league they finished in 18th place. The following season they finished 8th and won the Bolton Hospitals Cup again. And in 2007–08 they completed a third successive Bolton Hospitals Cup win, while finishing in 16th place in the league. The following season was once again seen as a disappointment, a 14th-placed finish and being unable to retain the Hospital's cup led to both manager and caretaker manager losing their jobs.

The 2009–10 season saw two former players return as joint managers, 26-year-old Anthony Johnson and 25-year-old Bernard Morley. The team finished in 4th place with a new club record of fourteen away victories. The following season (2010–11) was even better as the team once again broke plenty of club records including its highest ever finish in the club's history by taking the runners-up trophy.

The 2011–12 season saw the club take the Premier Division title, gaining not only promotion to the Northern Premier League Division One North but also giving the club its highest-ever finish. The side broke many club records – 31 league wins, 16 away league wins, 108 league goals scored, and 96 points amassed, were just a few of the season's highlights, as well as numerous 'Player of the Month' awards being won. At the North West Counties AGM dinner in Blackpool, joint managers Johnson and Morley were awarded with the Managers of the Year award.

The 2012–13 season saw the club play in the Northern Premier League for the first time. The team missed out on a play-off place in the last minutes of the season: needing a single point, for which a draw would have sufficed, after 81 minutes the team were 1–0 up before division champions Skelmersdale United scored two late goals. The club finished in 6th place and two of its players, Lee Gaskell and Gary Stopforth, were named in the league's 'Team of the Year'.

2013–14 proved to be Ramsbottom's best season to date. Despite being deducted three points towards the end of the season, they managed to take fifth place and the last play-off spot. They proceeded to defeat Darlington 1883 in the semi-finals, before passing Bamber Bridge 3–2 after extra time in the final, reaching the Northern Premier League Premier Division, the seventh tier of English football, for the first time in their history.

After six years in the role, joint managers Johnson and Morley resigned in January 2015, moving to manage Salford City. The club appointed former player Jon Robinson as new manager. Along with the management duo, the club lost quite a few of their influential players to Salford City at this time. Whilst the club succeeded in staying in the Northern Premier League Premier Division for the start 2015–16 season, they never really recovered from the player and management losses and the club were relegated for the first time in their 50-year history at the end of the 2015–16 season. 2016–17 saw a mid table finish in the Evo Stik North Division 1, Mark Fell and Paul Fildes were appointed in May 2016 with former league player Gareth Seddon signed. It was an inconsistent season with Fildes sacked after the Boxing Day defeat to Radcliffe, leaving Fell in sole charge.

Stadium
Ramsbottom play their home games at the Harry Williams Riverside Stadium, which is situated near the town centre, next to the East Lancashire Railway line and Ramsbottom Cricket Club. The ground was given the name of their long-serving chairman form the 2010–11 season. It is fully enclosed and behind one goal is a long covered stand named after long serving club stalwart Jack Wolfenden. The other goal has terracing behind it, over which covers were erected in 2013. One side of the pitch has two smaller covered stands, situated either side of the halfway line. Floodlights were installed in the 1996–97 season, acquired from Oldham RLFC's Watersheddings stadium.

Ground developments during the summer of 2013 saw the addition of a large sponsors' lounge, however, the Boxing Day floods of 2015 caused significant damage to the whole stadium including the sponsors' lounge.

Players

Non-playing staff

Source:Club details

Notable former players
Andy Barlow
Dale Jennings 
Anthony Johnson
Tom Kennedy 
Dominic McHale
Bernard Morley
Joel Pilkington
Gareth Seddon

Honours

League
Northern Premier League Division One North
Play-off Winners: 2013–14
North West Counties Football League Premier Division
Champions: 2011–12
Runners-up: 2010–11
North West Counties Football League Division Two
 Champions: 1996–97
Manchester Football League Division One
Champions: 1990–91
Bolton Combination Premier Division
Champions: 1976–77
Bolton Combination Division One
Champions: 1972–73
Runners-up: 1984–85 
Bolton Combination Division Two
Runners-up: 1982–83

Cup
North West Counties Football League Second Division Trophy
Winners: 1995–96
Bolton Hospitals Cup
Winners: 1974–75 1998–99 2005–06, 2006–07, 2007–08
Runners-up: 2001–02
Bolton Combination Jackson Cup
Winners: 1979–80 
Runners-up: 1981–82 1985–86
Bolton Combination Open Cup
Winners: 1976–77 1983–84 
Runners-up: 1987–88

Attendances

Records
Largest attendance: 2,104 vs United of Manchester, Evo-Stik Northern Premier, 4 April 2015

Averages
At the end of the 2019–20 season, the average league-game attendance at the Harry Williams Riverside Stadium for the 2019–20 season was 307.

Past averages (league only):
2020–21: 278* (at Lockdown 2)
2019–20: 307
2018–19: 225
2017–18: 210
2016–17: 221
2015–16: 218 
2014–15: 354 
2013–14: 262 
2012–13: 233
2011–12: 197
2010–11: 151
2009–10: 135
2008–09: 115
2007–08: 123
2006–07: 214
2005–06: 141
2004–05: 159
2003–04: 133

Source: English football site

References

External links

Rammy Stats statisticial and historical website
Online matchday programmes

 
Association football clubs established in 1966
Football clubs in England
North West Counties Football League clubs
Sport in the Borough of Rossendale
Football clubs in the Metropolitan Borough of Bury
1966 establishments in England
Northern Premier League clubs